The following list contains a run down of politicians, individuals, Constituency Labour Parties, trade unions (both Labour Party affiliated and not), socialist societies, newspapers, magazines and other organisations that endorsed a candidate in the 2016 leadership election

Summary

Labour politicians

Jeremy Corbyn
MPs 

Diane Abbott, Shadow Health Secretary since 2016; candidate for Leader in 2010; MP for Hackney North and Stoke Newington
Richard Burgon, Shadow Justice Secretary and Shadow Lord Chancellor since 2016; MP for Leeds East
Dawn Butler, former Minister for Young Citizens and Youth Engagement 2009–2010; MP for Brent South 2005–2010; MP for Brent Central since 2015.
Ronnie Campbell, MP for Blyth Valley
Stephen Hepburn, MP for Jarrow
Imran Hussain, Shadow Minister of State for International Development since 2016; MP for Bradford East
Ian Lavery, Shadow Minister for Trade Unions & Civil Society since 2015; MP for Wansbeck
Clive Lewis, Shadow Defence Secretary since 2016; MP for Norwich South
Rebecca Long-Bailey, Shadow Chief Secretary to the Treasury; MP for Salford and Eccles
Andy McDonald, Shadow Transport Secretary since 2016, MP for Middlesbrough
John McDonnell, Shadow Chancellor since 2015; candidate for Leader in 2007 and 2010; MP for Hayes and Harlington (campaign manager)
Ian Mearns, MP for Gateshead
Grahame Morris, Shadow Communities and Local Government Secretary since 2016; MP for Easington
Kate Osamor, Shadow International Development Secretary since 2016; MP for Edmonton
Angela Rayner, Shadow Secretary of State for Education and Shadow Minister for Women and Equalities since 2016, MP for Ashton-under-Lyne
Dennis Skinner, former Chairman of the Labour Party (1988–1989); MP for Bolsover
Emily Thornberry, Shadow Foreign Secretary since 2016, MP for Islington South and Finsbury
Jon Trickett, Shadow Secretary of State for Business since 2016; MP for Hemsworth

MEPs

Lucy Anderson, MEP for London
Julie Ward, MEP for North West England

Other Labour politicians

Mick Antoniw, AM for Pontypridd
Jennette Arnold, AM for North East
Bill Butler, former MSP for Glasgow Anniesland
Neil Findlay, MSP for Lothian
Mike Hedges, Member of the Welsh Assembly for Swansea East
Cara Hilton, former MSP for Dunfermline
Richard Leonard, MSP for Central Scotland
Ken Livingstone, former Mayor of London (2000–2008)
Murad Qureshi, former London-wide Member of the London Assembly for the Labour Party
Alex Rowley, Deputy Leader of the Scottish Labour Party since 2015; MSP for Mid Scotland and Fife
Elaine Smith, former Deputy Presiding Officer of the Scottish Parliament; MSP for Central Scotland
Chris Williamson, former MP for Derby North

Owen Smith
MPs 

MEPs
Paul Brannen, MEP for North East England
Richard Corbett, MEP for Yorkshire and the Humber
Seb Dance, MEP for London
Theresa Griffin, MEP for North West England
Richard Howitt, MEP for the East of England
David Martin, MEP for Scotland
Linda McAvan, MEP for Yorkshire and the Humber
Catherine Stihler, MEP for Scotland
Derek Vaughan, MEP for Wales
Glenis Willmott, Leader of the European Parliamentary Labour Party since 2009; MEP for the East Midlands
Other Labour politicians

Leighton Andrews, former Minister for Education and Skills (2009–2013); former Member of the Welsh Assembly for Rhondda
Tom Copley AM, London Assembly Member (London-Wide)
Hefin David, Member of the Welsh Assembly for Caerphilly
Kezia Dugdale, Leader of the Scottish Labour Party since 2015
Peter Hain, Baron Hain, former Shadow Welsh Secretary (2010–2012) and Welsh Secretary (2002–2008; 2009–2010); former MP for Neath
Sadiq Khan, Mayor of London since 2016
Lee Waters, Member of the Welsh Assembly for Llanelli
Stewart Wood, Baron Wood of Anfield, former co-Shadow Minister without Portfolio (2011–2015)

Angela Eagle

Individuals

Jeremy Corbyn

Akala, rapper and poet
Attila the Stockbroker, punk poet, musician and songwriter
Lily Allen, singer, songwriter, actress and television presenter
Angela Barnes, comedian
Mike Barson, multi-instrumentalist, songwriter, composer, and keyboardist for Madness
Joey Barton, professional footballer
Billy Bragg, singer
Charlotte Church, singer-songwriter, actress and television presenter
Jack Carroll, comedian and a runner-up on Britain's Got Talent
Janice Connolly, actress, comedian and artistic director
Manuel Cortes, General Secretary of the Transport Salaried Staffs' Association (TSSA)
Miriam David, Professor of Education at the Institute of Education, University of London
Ivor Dembina, stand-up comedian
Professor Stephen Deutsch, composer
Danny DeVito, actor, comedian and director
Brian Eno, musician and composer
Jennie Formby, regional secretary and former political director of Unite the Union
George Galloway, Leader of the Respect Party (2013–2016), broadcaster and former MP for Bradford West (2012–2015)
Janey Godley, stand-up comedian and writer
Jeremy Hardy, comedian
Rufus Hound, comedian, actor and presenter
Robin Ince, comedian, actor and writer
Selma James, feminist writer
Lee Jasper, Senior Policy Advisor on Equalities to the former Mayor of London Ken Livingston
Owen Jones, journalist and political commentator
Shappi Khorsandi, comedian
Ken Loach, film and television director
Norman Lovett, stand-up comedian and actor
Miriam Margolyes, actress
Francesca Martinez, comedian and writer
Paul Mason, journalist and writer
Len McCluskey, general secretary of Unite the Union
Ewan McGregor, actor
Patrick Monahan, comedian
Alan Moore, comic book writer
Charles Shaar Murray, music journalist and broadcaster
Dave Nellist, former Labour MP and national chair of TUSC
Jo Neary, comedian, writer and actress
Novelist, grime MC and producer
Tyrone O'Sullivan, former NUM branch secretary and trade union activist
Sara Pascoe, stand-up comedian and actress
Maxine Peake, actress
Grace Petrie, singer-songwriter
John Rees, founder of Counterfire and Stop The War Coalition
Michael Rosen, novelist and poet
Zack Sabre Jr., professional wrestler
Alexei Sayle, stand-up comedian and actor
Ian Saville, magician
Lynne Segal, socialist feminist academic and activist
Mark Serwotka, General Secretary of the Public and Commercial Services Union
Arthur Smith, alternative comedian and writer
Harry Leslie Smith, writer and political commentator
Mark Steel, stand-up comedian and columnist
Ava Vidal, comedian
Holly Walsh, comedian
Dave Ward, General Secretary of Communication Workers Union
Matt Wrack, General Secretary of the Fire Brigades Union

Owen Smith

Tracy-Ann Oberman, actress
Frances Barber, actress
David Blanchflower, labour economist, former member of McDonnell's Economic Advisory Committee (resigned in June 2016)
Alastair Campbell, journalist, broadcaster, and former Director of Communications and Strategy to Prime Minister Tony Blair
Charlie Condou, actor and writer (endorsed Andy Burnham in 2015)
William Dalrymple, historian and writer
Robert Harris, novelist
Konnie Huq, television presenter and writer
Jason Isaacs, actor
Ross Kemp, actor and investigative journalist
Paul Kenny, former General Secretary of GMB
Nick Miles, actor
Caitlin Moran, English journalist, author, and broadcaster at The Times (endorsed Jeremy Corbyn in 2015)
Richard Murphy, British chartered accountant and political economist (endorsed Jeremy Corbyn in 2015)
Jay Rayner, journalist, writer, broadcaster and food critic
Tony Robinson, actor, comedian and TV presenter
J. K. Rowling, novelist, author of the Harry Potter fantasy series
Abby Tomlinson, founder and leader of the Milifandom (endorsed Andy Burnham in 2015)
Robert Webb, comedian, actor and writer (endorsed Yvette Cooper in 2015)
Simon Wren-Lewis, economist, former member of the Economic Advisory Committee

Constituency Labour Parties

Jeremy Corbyn
Jeremy Corbyn received the supporting nomination of 285 CLPs.

Owen Smith
Owen Smith received the supporting nomination of 53 CLPs.

Affiliated trade unions

Jeremy Corbyn
UNISON
Unite the Union (Unite)
Associated Society of Locomotive Engineers and Firemen (ASLEF)
Communication Workers Union (CWU)
Transport Salaried Staffs' Association (TSSA)
Union of Construction, Allied Trades and Technicians (UCATT)
Fire Brigades Union (FBU)
Bakers, Food and Allied Workers' Union (BFAWU)

Owen Smith
General, Municipal, Boilermakers and Allied Trade Union (GMB)
Community
Musicians' Union (MU)
Union of Shop, Distributive and Allied Workers (USDAW)

Undeclared
Broadcasting, Entertainment, Communications and Theatre Union (BECTU)
National Union of Mineworkers (NUM)

Non-affiliated trade unions

Jeremy Corbyn
Prison Officers Association (POA)
National Union of Rail, Maritime and Transport Workers (RMT)

Socialist societies

Jeremy Corbyn
Disability Labour

Owen Smith
Jewish Labour Movement
Labour Movement for Europe
Socialist Health Association (endorsed Jeremy Corbyn in 2015)

Undeclared

BAME Labour
Chinese for Labour
Christians on the Left
Fabian Society
Labour Animal Welfare Society
Labour Campaign for International Development 
LGBT Labour
Labour Finance and Industry Group
Labour Housing Group
Labour Party Irish Society
Labour Students 
Labour Women's Network
National Union of Labour and Socialist Clubs
Scientists for Labour
Socialist Educational Association
Socialist Environment and Resources Association
Society of Labour Lawyers
Tamils for Labour

Affiliated organisations

Jeremy Corbyn
Young Labour

Organisations

Jeremy Corbyn
Alliance for Workers' Liberty (AWL)
Campaign for Labour Party Democracy (CLPD)
Disabled People Against Cuts (DPAC)
Rudimental, English drum and bass band
Labour Campaign for Nuclear Disarmament (Labour CND)
Lesbians and Gays Support the Miners (LGSM)
Labour Party Marxists
Labour Representation Committee
National Campaign Against Fees and Cuts
Stop the War Coalition (StWC)
UB40, English reggae band

Owen Smith
Progress

Publications

References

2016 in the United Kingdom
2016 Labour Party (UK) leadership election
Labour Party leadership election, 2016
Labour Party leadership election (UK)